Tanush Kotian (born 16 October 1998) is an Indian cricketer. He made his first-class debut for Mumbai in the 2018–19 Ranji Trophy on 22 December 2018. He made his List A debut on 9 March 2021, for Mumbai in the 2020–21 Vijay Hazare Trophy. He made his Twenty20 debut on 4 November 2021, for Mumbai in the 2021–22 Syed Mushtaq Ali Trophy.

References

External links
 

1998 births
Living people
Indian cricketers
Mumbai cricketers
Place of birth missing (living people)